Joe Fitzpatrick (born 20 August 1997) is an English footballer who is currently a free agent.

Career
Fitzpatrick joined Mansfield Town from the Wolverhampton Wanderers academy in 2014. He made his professional debut on 10 February 2015 in a 2–1 defeat away at Morecambe.

References

External links
 
 

1997 births
Living people
English footballers
Mansfield Town F.C. players
Sutton Coldfield Town F.C. players
English Football League players
People from Oldbury, West Midlands
Association football midfielders